Henry C. McRae  was an American football coach.  He served as the head football coach at Hillsdale College in Hillsdale, Michigan for one season in 1904, compiling a record of 0–7.  McRae, who also played on the team, was the first full time coach in the school's history. He also served as athletic director.

References

Year of death missing
Year of birth missing
American football quarterbacks
Hillsdale Chargers athletic directors
Hillsdale Chargers football coaches
Hillsdale Chargers football players